Eulima patula (known commonly as the Largemouth Eulima) a species of sea snail, a marine gastropod mollusk in the family Eulimidae. The species was previously one of a number within the genus Eulima.

Distribution
This species occurs in the following locations:
 Caribbean Sea
 Cuba
 Gulf of Mexico
 Puerto Rico
 United Kingdom Exclusive Economic Zone

Description 
The maximum recorded shell length is 6 mm.

Habitat 
Minimum recorded depth is 4 m. Maximum recorded depth is 805 m.

References

External links
 Dall, W.H. & Simpson, C.T. (1901) The Mollusca of Porto Rico. Bulletin of the United States Fish Commission, 20, 351–524
 Souza L.S. de & Pimenta A.D. (2019). Eulimacrostoma gen. nov., a new genus of Eulimidae (Gastropoda, Caenogastropoda) with description of a new species and reevaluation of other western Atlantic species. Zoosystematics and Evolution. 95(2): 403-415

Eulimacrostoma
Gastropods described in 1901